Helen Slottje is an American lawyer and environmental activist. She received the Goldman Environmental Prize in 2014.

Life 

Helen lives in Ithaca, New York with her husband. She previously worked as a commercial attorney in Boston.

She began fighting fracking after attending a presentation on the topic in 2009. She is credited with helping pass bans against fracking in more than a hundred communities in New York.

References 

American environmentalists
Living people
Year of birth missing (living people)
Goldman Environmental Prize awardees